Shur Ab (also Romanized as Shūr Āb and Shūrāb; also known as Shorokh, Shoruk, Showrūk, and Shūrek) is a village in Gowharan Rural District, in the Central District of Khoy County, West Azerbaijan Province, Iran. At the 2006 census, its population was 306, in 78 families.

References 

Populated places in Khoy County